Indu Nagaraj is an Indian playback singer who primarily works in Kannada cinema. She is the recipient of a Filmfare Award for the song "Pyarge Aagbittaite" from the film Govindaya Namaha (2012).

Life and career
She sang for many films which had compositions by Gurukiran, Arjun Janya and V. Harikrishna.

In 2012, Indu won the Filmfare Award for Best Female Playback Singer for the song "Pyarge Aagbittaite" from the film Govindaya Namaha.

Discography
This is a partial list of notable films of Indu Nagaraj.

Television

References

External links
 
 Indu Nagaraj songs list

Living people
Kannada playback singers
Women Carnatic singers
Carnatic singers
Singers from Mysore
Kannada people
Indian women playback singers
Filmfare Awards South winners
Women musicians from Karnataka
21st-century Indian singers
Year of birth missing (living people)
Film musicians from Karnataka
21st-century Indian women singers